The Commandant of the Marine Corps ( or abbreviated by Dankormar) is the highest position of Indonesian Marine Corps. Marine Corps is currently an integral part of the Navy (TNI-AL) and the personnel development is under the responsibility of the Chief of Staff of the Indonesian Navy.  

Commandant of the Marine Corps reports to the Commander of the Indonesian National Armed Forces. Commandant of Marine Corps also held the highest rank in the Marine Corps, which is Major General. However, it is possible to be promoted into higher rank if appointed into a position in Navy or National Armed Forces HQ that requires 3-star rank or higher. Commandant of the Marine Corps is assisted by Deputy Commandant of the Marine Corps (a one-star marine general, previously called Chief of Staffs of the Marine Corps).

List of Commandant of the Marine Corps

See also
Indonesian National Armed Forces
Indonesian Navy

References

Military of Indonesia
Marines
Indonesian Navy